IMamiellaceae is a family of green algae in the order Mamiellales.

References

External links
 AlgaeBase

Green algae families
Mamiellophyceae